Progress-M (GRAU indices 11F615A55 and 11F615A60), also known as Progress 7K-TGM, is a Russian, previously Soviet spacecraft which is used to resupply space stations. It is a variant of the Progress spacecraft, originally built in the late 1980s as a modernised version of the Progress 7K-TG spacecraft, using new systems developed for the Soyuz-T and Soyuz-TM spacecraft. The 11F61560 variant incorporated further modernisation, with digital flight control systems replacing the earlier analogue ones. The older 11F615A55 spacecraft outlived the newer 11F615A60. The final Progress-M, Progress-M-UM, was launched on 24 November 2021.

The first forty three Progress-M spacecraft were used to resupply Mir, with subsequent spacecraft flying to the International Space Station. , eighty seven spacecraft have been launched, with sixty seven using the older model, and twenty using the newer version. Launches of the 11F615A60 are continuing. One 11F615A60, Progress M-12M, was lost in a launch failure in August 2011. Progress M-27M was launched on 28 April 2015 but communication with the vessel was lost soon after. With vehicle control lost, it is expected to destructively re-enter due to orbital decay.

Two Progress M spacecraft, M-14 and M-38, were modified to carry VDU attitude control systems to the Mir space station.

The Progress M1 is a derivative of the Progress M, optimized to carry more fuel, at the expense of dry cargo and water. It entered service in 2000, and was retired in 2004. A modernised version, incorporating the upgrades made to the Progress M 11F615A60 was scheduled to enter service in 2011, however this was cancelled before it made its first flight.

The upgraded Progress MS spacecraft flew for the first time in December 2015.

See also 
 Comparison of orbital spacecraft
 Automated Transfer Vehicle
 Cygnus spacecraft
 SpaceX Dragon
 H-II Transfer Vehicle

References

External links 

 
 
 

Progress (spacecraft)